The 1901 Paris–Tours was the second edition of the Paris–Tours cycle race and was held on 30 June 1901. The race started in Paris and finished in Tours. The race was won by Jean Fischer.

General classification

Notes

References

1901 in French sport
1901